Alex Webb (born May 5, 1952) is a photographer who makes vibrant and complex color photographs. He has been a member of Magnum Photos since 1979.

Webb's books include Hot Light/Half-Made Worlds (1986), Under a Grudging Sun (1989) From The Sunshine State (1996), Amazon (1997) Crossings (2003), Istanbul (2007), The Suffering of Light (2011), La Calle (2016), as well as with photographer Rebecca Norris Webb, his wife and creative partner—Violet Isle (2009), Memory City (2014), Alex Webb and Rebecca Norris Webb on Street Photography and the Poetic Image (2014), Slant Rhymes (2017), and Brooklyn: The City Within (2019).

He has exhibited at museums worldwide, including the Whitney Museum of Art and the Metropolitan Museum in New York, and the High Museum of Art in Atlanta, Georgia. He was awarded a Guggenheim Fellowship in 2007. He has contributed to Geo, Time, National Geographic, and The New York Times Magazine.

Career
Born in San Francisco, Webb was raised in New England. He became interested in photography as a high school student at The Putney School and in 1972 attended the Apeiron Workshops in Millerton, New York, where he met Magnum photographers Bruce Davidson and Charles Harbutt. Webb went on to study history and literature at Harvard University (graduating in 1974), but also studied photography at the Carpenter Center for the Visual Arts. By 1974 he was working as a photojournalist and in 1976 became an associate member of Magnum Photos. During this time he documented small-town life in the American South. He also did some work in the Caribbean and Mexico, which led him, in 1978, to begin working in color, which he has continued to do.

Webb's work has been exhibited at the Walker Art Center, the Museum of Photographic Arts, the International Center of Photography, the High Museum of Art, the Museum of Contemporary Art in San Diego, and the Whitney Museum of American Art. He has received commissions from the High Museum of Art as well as the Banesto Foundation in Spain.

Webb now lives and works in Brooklyn, New York with his wife, Rebecca Norris Webb, who is also a photographer, and they have collaborated on a number of books

Publications

Books by Webb
Hot Light/Half-Made Worlds: Photographs from the Tropics, New York: Thames & Hudson, 1986. 
Under a Grudging Sun: Photographs from Haiti Libere, New York: Thames & Hudson, 1989. 
From The Sunshine State: Photographs of Florida, New York: Monacelli Press, Inc., 1996. 
Amazon: From the Floodplains to the Clouds USA: Monacelli Press, Inc., 1997. 
Dislocations, Edition of 40. Massachusttes: Film Study Center at Harvard University, 1998-1999.
Crossings: Photographs from the U.S.-Mexico Border. New York: Monacelli Press, 2003. . With an essay by Tom Miller.
Istanbul: City of a Hundred Names. New York: Aperture, 2007. . With Orhan Pamuk.
The Suffering of Light. New York: Aperture, 2011. 
La Calle. New York, NY: Aperture. 2016. p. 176. .

Books paired with Rebecca Norris Webb
Alex Webb and Rebecca Norris Webb, Violet Isle. Santa Fe, NM: Radius, 2009. . With an introduction by Pico Iyer.
Alex Webb and Rebecca Norris Webb, Memory City. Santa Fe, NM: Radius. 2014. p. 172. . 
Alex Webb and Rebecca Norris Webb on Street Photography and the Poetic Image: The Photography Workshop Series. New York, NY: Aperture. 2014. p. 128. . With an introduction by Teju Cole.
Alex Webb and Rebecca Norris Webb, Slant Rhymes. Madrid: La Fábrica, 2017. .
Alex Webb and Rebecca Norris Webb, Brooklyn: The City Within. Aperture, 2019. .
Alex Webb and Rebecca Norris Webb, Waves. Santa Fe, NM: Radius. 2022. .

Publications with contributions by Webb
Endure: Renewal from Ground Zero. New York: Rockefeller Foundation, 2001. . By Webb, Antonín Kratochvíl, Jurek Wajdowicz, Carolina Salguero and Larry Towell.
Alex Webb Habla Con Max Kozloff, Conversaciones con fotógrafos. Barcelona, Spain: La Fabrica, 2003. . Pp. 75.
Conversations with Contemporary Photographers. New York: Umbrage, 2005. . Transcript of a conversation between Webb and Max Kozloff. Pp. 150.
Contatti. Provini d'Autore = Choosing the best photo by using the contact sheet. Vol. II. Edited by Giammaria De Gasperis. Rome: Postcart, 2013. .
Home. Tokyo: Magnum Photos Tokyo, 2018. .

Non-English Language Publications

 Karibik. Hamburg: Mare, 2010. . German language version.
 La Sofferenza della Luce. Milan: Contrasto, 2011. . Italian language version.
 La Souffrance et la Joie de la Lumière. Paris: Textuel, 2011. . French language version.
 Alex Webb and Rebecca Norris Webb, Rimas de Reojo. Madrid: La Fábrica, 2017. . Spanish language version.

Awards
1988: Leopold Godowsky, Jr. Color Photography Award, Photographic Resource Center (PRC) at Boston University
2007: Guggenheim Fellowship from the John Simon Guggenheim Memorial Foundation
2019: Recipient of National Endowment for the Arts Grant

References

External links

Official Website of Alex Webb and Rebecca Norris Webb
Portfolio at Magnum Photos
A Spotlight on the Season’s Top Photography Books by Luc Sante, New York Times.
Capturing Complexity and Color in Mexico by James Estrin, The New York Times Lens Blog.

Photographers from California
1952 births
Living people
Harvard College alumni
People from Brooklyn